The 43rd parallel north is a circle of latitude that is 43 degrees north of the Earth's equatorial plane. It crosses Europe, the Mediterranean Sea, Asia, the Pacific Ocean, North America, and the Atlantic Ocean.

On 21 June the sun averages, with negligible variance, its local maximum, 70.83 degrees in the sky.

At this latitude the sun is visible for 15 hours, 22 minutes during the summer solstice and 9 hours, 0 minutes during the winter solstice.

Around the world
Starting at the Prime Meridian and heading eastwards, the parallel 43° north passes through:

{| class="wikitable plainrowheaders"
! scope="col" width="125" | Co-ordinates
! scope="col" | Country, territory or sea
! scope="col" | Notes
|-
| 
! scope="row" | 
|
|-
| style="background:#b0e0e6;" | 
! scope="row" style="background:#b0e0e6;" | Mediterranean Sea
| style="background:#b0e0e6;" | Gulf of Lion
|-
| 
! scope="row" | 
| Îles d'Hyères
|-
| style="background:#b0e0e6;" | 
! scope="row" style="background:#b0e0e6;" | Mediterranean Sea
| style="background:#b0e0e6;" |
|-
| 
! scope="row" | 
| Island of Corsica
|-
| style="background:#b0e0e6;" | 
! scope="row" style="background:#b0e0e6;" | Mediterranean Sea
| style="background:#b0e0e6;" | Passing just south of the island of Capraia, 
|-
| 
! scope="row" | 
| Gallina Grottammare
|-
| style="background:#b0e0e6;" | 
! scope="row" style="background:#b0e0e6;" | Adriatic Sea
| style="background:#b0e0e6;" | Passing just south of the island of Vis,  Passing just north of the island of Korčula, 
|-
| 
! scope="row" | 
| 
|-
| 
! scope="row" | 
|
|-
| 
! scope="row" | 
|
|-
| 
! scope="row" | 
|
|-valign="top"
| 
! scope="row" |  or 
| Kosovo is a partially recognised state. Some nations consider its territory to be part of Serbia.
|-
| 
! scope="row" | 
| passing through Leskovac
|-
| 
! scope="row" | 
|
|-
| style="background:#b0e0e6;" | 
! scope="row" style="background:#b0e0e6;" | Black Sea
| style="background:#b0e0e6;" |
|-valign="top"
| 
! scope="row" |  or 
| Abkhazia is a partially recognised state. Most nations consider its territory to be part of Georgia.
Passing through Sukhumi.
|-
| 
! scope="row" | 
|
|-
| 
! scope="row" | 
| Passing through Vladikavkaz and Makhachkala
|-
| style="background:#b0e0e6;" | 
! scope="row" style="background:#b0e0e6;" | Caspian Sea
| style="background:#b0e0e6;" |
|-
| 
! scope="row" | 
|
|-
| 
! scope="row" | 
|
|-
| 
! scope="row" | 
| Passing just north of Taraz
|-
| 
! scope="row" | 
| Passing just north of Bishkek
|-
| 
! scope="row" | 
|
|-
| 
! scope="row" | 
| Xinjiang
|-
| 
! scope="row" | 
|
|-valign="top"
| 
! scope="row" | 
| Inner Mongolia Liaoning Jilin (for about 26 km) Liaoning (for about 14 km) Jilin
|-
| 
! scope="row" | 
| For about 5 km (county of Onsong)
|-
| 
! scope="row" | 
| Jilin
|-
| 
! scope="row" | 
| Primorsky Krai — passing just south of Vladivostok
|-
| style="background:#b0e0e6;" | 
! scope="row" style="background:#b0e0e6;" | Sea of Japan
| style="background:#b0e0e6;" | Amur Bay
|-
| 
! scope="row" | 
| Russky Island
|-
| style="background:#b0e0e6;" | 
! scope="row" style="background:#b0e0e6;" | Sea of Japan
| style="background:#b0e0e6;" | Ussuri Bay
|-
| 
! scope="row" | 
|
|-
| style="background:#b0e0e6;" | 
! scope="row" style="background:#b0e0e6;" | Sea of Japan
| style="background:#b0e0e6;" |
|-
| 
! scope="row" | 
| Island of Hokkaidō — passing just south of Sapporo
|-
| style="background:#b0e0e6;" | 
! scope="row" style="background:#b0e0e6;" | Pacific Ocean
| style="background:#b0e0e6;" |
|-valign="top"
| 
! scope="row" | 
| Oregon - passing just north of Crater Lake Idaho Wyoming South Dakota / Nebraska border South Dakota Iowa Wisconsin — passing through Milwaukee
The parallel 43° north forms most of the boundary between the State of Nebraska and the State of South Dakota. The parallel formed the northern border of the historic and extralegal Territory of Jefferson.
|-
| style="background:#b0e0e6;" | 
! scope="row" style="background:#b0e0e6;" | Lake Michigan
| style="background:#b0e0e6;" |
|-
| 
! scope="row" | 
| Michigan - Passing through Grand Rapids and Flint
|-
| 
! scope="row" | 
| Ontario — passing through the cities of Sarnia, London, and Welland
|-valign="top"
| 
! scope="row" | 
| New York - Passing through the University at Buffalo and Syracuse Vermont New Hampshire - passing through Manchester
|-
| style="background:#b0e0e6;" | 
! scope="row" style="background:#b0e0e6;" | Atlantic Ocean
| style="background:#b0e0e6;" |
|-
| 
! scope="row" | 
| Cee (province of A Coruña) Passing through Lugo Reinosa
|-
| 
! scope="row" | 
|
|-
|}

See also
42nd parallel north
44th parallel north

References

n43
Borders of Nebraska
Borders of South Dakota